Himanshu Thakur (born January 9, 1994 in Manali, Kullu district, Himachal Pradesh, India) is an alpine skier from India. He competed for India at the 2014 Winter Olympics in the giant slalom race securing a rank of 72.

Thakur was named to India's 2017 Asian Winter Games team in February 2017.

Personal life
His sister Aanchal Thakur is also an international alpine skier.

Alpine skiing results
All results are sourced from the International Ski Federation (FIS).

Olympic results

World Championship results

References

External links
 

1994 births
Living people
Indian male alpine skiers
Olympic alpine skiers of India
Alpine skiers at the 2014 Winter Olympics
Alpine skiers at the 2017 Asian Winter Games
People from Manali, Himachal Pradesh
Skiers from Himachal Pradesh